Omar Rodriguez is the second studio album by The Mars Volta guitarist Omar Rodríguez-López and the first in the "Amsterdam series" (written and recorded in the city in early June 2005). Most of the overdubs were done on the road in August 2005 (during The Mars Volta North American tour) and the album was mixed in September. Gold Standard Laboratories began offering a limited edition vinyl picture disc of this release for mail order in December 2006.

The Omar Rodriguez-Lopez Quintet, which formed in unison with the release of this record, toured Europe in November 2005 in support of this new release.  Joining then on stage for their November 14, 2005 performance in Cologne, Germany was Damo Suzuki, for the song "Please Heat This Eventually" which would resurface on the next two releases from the group.

The centerpiece of the album, Jacob van Lennepkade (which was also recorded at the same November 14, 2005 show and later released on The Apocalypse Inside of an Orange as the title track) is named after the street in which Omar lived during its recording in Amsterdam.

Track listing

Personnel
Omar Rodríguez-López – guitar, sitar, bass, gong, percussion
Adrián Terrazas-González – saxophone, bass clarinet, percussion
Marcel Rodríguez-López – drums, keyboards, gong, percussion
Juan Alderete – bass (2)
Jon Debaun – recording engineer, bass (3)
Cedric Bixler-Zavala – tambora (4)
Eric Salas – drums (5)

References

2005 albums
Omar Rodríguez-López albums
Albums produced by Omar Rodríguez-López